C. alba  may refer to:
 Calidris alba, syn. Crocethia alba, the sanderling, a small wader species and a circumpolar Arctic breeder
 Carex alba, white sedge
 Chiococca alba, a flowering plant species native to Florida and the Lower Rio Grande Valley of Texas in the United States, Mexico, Central America, Caribbean and tropical South America
 Copernicia alba, a palm tree species found in Bolivia, Paraguay, Colombia, Brazil and Argentina
 Cornus alba, the Siberian, white or red-barked dogwood, a large shrub or small tree species
 Correa alba, the white correa, a shrub species endemic to Australia
 Cryptocarya alba, the peumo, an evergreen tree species found in Chile
 Cyclaspis alba, a crustacean species in the genus Cyclaspis

See also
 Alba (disambiguation)